This is a list of various types of football, including most variations of gridiron, rugby and association football.

Games descended from The FA rules

Association football, also known as "football" or "soccer".
Association football varieties with reduced number of team members:
Five-a-side football – played throughout the world under various rules, including:
Indoor soccer – the six-a-side indoor game as played in North America.
Seven-a-side football – a variation of minifootball played by teams of seven players.
Sevens football – a seven-a-side game played in India.
Paralympic association football – modified association football for disabled competitors.
Amputee football
Blind football
CP or 7-a-side football – for players with cerebral palsy.
Powerchair football and wheelchair soccer
Beach soccer – played on sand, also known as sand football. Like futsal, it is governed by FIFA.
Jorkyball
Rush goalie – a variation of football in which the role of the goalkeeper is more flexible than normal.
Keepie uppie – the art of juggling with a football using feet, knees, chest, shoulders, and head.
Footbag or hacky sack – a small bean bag or sand bag is used as a ball in a number of keepie uppie variations such as hacky sack.
Freestyle football – a modern take on keepie uppie where freestylers are graded for their entertainment value and expression of skill.
Swamp football
Street football – encompasses a number of informal varieties of football.
Walking football
3v3 Soccer
Three-sided football
Roller soccer
Crab football
Ice football

Some games, such as football tennis, footvolley and teqball, are not related to association football, but use a football to produce a variant of another game. The hockey game bandy has rules partly based on association football rules and is sometimes nicknamed "winter football".

Games descended from Rugby School rules
 Rugby football – the game which split into rugby union and rugby league.
 Rugby league
 Rugby league sevens
 Rugby league nines
 Touch rugby or touch football – a form of rugby without tackles.
 Federation of International Touch codified version of touch rugby.
 Tag rugby – a form of touch rugby, but a velcro tag must be taken to indicate a tackle.
 OzTag – a form of rugby league replacing tackles with tags.
 Wheelchair rugby league
 Rugby union
 Rugby sevens
 Beach rugby – rugby played on sand.
 Wheelchair rugby or quad rugby
 American football – called "football" in the United States, and "gridiron" or "gridiron football" in Australia.
 Arena football – an indoor version of American football.
 Touch football (American) – non-tackle American football.
 Flag football – non-tackle American football, like touch football but a token must be taken to indicate a tackle.
 Canadian football – called simply "football" in Canada.
 Canadian flag football – non-tackle Canadian football.

Other surviving English public school games
Eton field game
Eton wall game
Harrow football
Winchester College football

Irish/Gaelic and Australian varieties of football
Although both sports arose largely independently, Gaelic football and Australian rules football or "Aussie rules" share a number of common characteristics that separate them from the other football codes, most notably the lack of an offside rule, rules requiring bouncing of the ball when running with it in hand, passing by kick or handstrike, and a scoring system with major and minor scores (goals and points in Gaelic football, goals and behinds in Australian rules). Both sports are also very popular in their country of origin, indeed the dominant code in each, but with limited global spread, a feature they share with gridiron forms of football.
 Gaelic football – called "football" by this sporting community.
 Australian rules football – called "football" in the south and west of Australia and also in Victoria.
 International rules football – a compromise code used for games between Gaelic and Australian rules players.
 Auskick – a version of Australian rules designed for young children.
 Austus – a compromise between Australian rules and American football, invented in Melbourne during World War II.

Surviving medieval ball games
 Traditional Shrove Tuesday matches in the United Kingdom – annual town- or village-wide football games with their own rules:
 Alnwick in Northumberland
 Ashbourne in Derbyshire (known as Royal Shrovetide Football)
 Atherstone in Warwickshire
 Corfe Castle in Dorset The Shrove Tuesday Football Ceremony of the Purbeck Marblers
 Haxey in North Lincolnshire (the Haxey Hood, actually played on Epiphany)
 Hurling the Silver Ball takes place at St Columb Major in Cornwall
 Sedgefield in County Durham
 In Scotland, the Ba game is still popular around Christmas and Hogmanay at:
 Duns in Berwickshire
 Scone in  Perthshire
 Kirkwall in Orkney
Outside the UK, other medieval games include:
 Calcio Fiorentino – a modern revival of Renaissance football from 16th century Florence.
La soule in Normandy and Brittany

Tabletop games and other recreations
 Based on FA rules:
 Subbuteo
 Blow football
 Foosball – also known as table football/soccer, babyfoot, bar football or gettone.
 Penny football – also known as coin football.
 Based on rugby:
 Penny rugby
 Based on American Football:
 Blood Bowl
 Paper football
 Others:
 Paper soccer – paper and pencil game.
 Phutball – board game.
 Bubble football

References

See also 

 List of football video games (disambiguation)
 Table football (disambiguation)
 Coin football (disambiguation)
 List of association football competitions

Types
Football types